Hughey is an unincorporated community located in the town of Cleveland, Taylor County, Wisconsin, United States. The community was named for Elmer K. Hughey, a president of a lumber company based in Stillwater, Minnesota.

Notes

Unincorporated communities in Taylor County, Wisconsin
Unincorporated communities in Wisconsin